Panos Constantinou (born November 1, 1985) is a retired Cypriot goalkeeper.

Career

AEL Limassol
Panos is a product of AEL's youth academies. He became a regular member of AEL in the 2007-2008 season and performed well. In the 2008-2009 season it looked like he was going to be second choice goalkeeper, after the signing of highly cited goalkeeper Pierre Ebede. However, after some very poor performances by Ebede, Constantinou was handed the starting position. So, he had established himself as the first-choice goalkeeper for AEL Limassol, despite his young age. He made some great saves and since he was in a very good form, it was expected by the media and fans to receive a national call-up, but this never happened. His exceptional form during the 2008-2009 season earned him a new 1-year contract with AEL Limassol which he signed on the 24th of March 2008, and stayed to the club until the summer of 2010.

APOEL
On May 29, 2010, he signed a one-year contract with APOEL. With APOEL he won the 2010–11 Cypriot First Division (appearing in only one match) and became a champion for the first time in his career. Two years later, he became champion again with APOEL, after winning the 2012–13 Cypriot First Division, although he didn't appear in any single match that season.

Honours
 APOEL
Cypriot First Division: 2
 2010–11, 2012–13
Cypriot Super Cup: 1
 2011

External links
 APOEL official profile
 

1985 births
Living people
Cypriot footballers
Association football goalkeepers
Cyprus international footballers
AEL Limassol players
APOEL FC players
Aris Limassol FC players
Apollon Pontou FC players
Pafos FC players
Cypriot First Division players
Cypriot Second Division players
Gamma Ethniki players
Cypriot expatriate footballers
Expatriate footballers in Greece